CHWI-DT (channel 16) is a television station licensed to Wheatley, Ontario, Canada, broadcasting CTV 2 programming to the Windsor area. Owned and operated by Bell Media, the station has studios at the Bell Canada Building in downtown Windsor with a secondary office in Chatham; its transmitter is located on Zion Road (between Concession Line Roads 4 and 5) in Chatham.

History

Beginnings: independent and BBS
Baton Broadcasting applied to the Canadian Radio-television and Telecommunications Commission (CRTC) for a licence to operate an independent television station for the Wheatley area, that would also serve Chatham and Windsor. This application was related to, and directly dependent on, Baton's purchase of CFPL-TV in London and CKNX-TV in Wingham from The Blackburn Group, as their intention was to launch a semi-satellite of CFPL-TV that served Chatham and Windsor. At the time, the only clear signals from Canadian stations were from TVOntario, the CBC and Télévision de Radio-Canada. The station's license application was approved on January 26, 1993, and CHWI-TV first began broadcasting on October 19, 1993. This marked Baton's return to television broadcasting in the region after the CBC had bought out Baton's majority interest in CKLW-TV in Windsor, renaming it CBET, in 1975 (Baton also operated radio stations in Windsor until 1984).

During its tenure as an independent station, it also aired ABC's Disney's One Saturday Morning schedule (along with, or from, the CTV affiliate in Kitchener, CKCO-TV), along with syndicated Disney shows in the afternoons on weekdays (The Disney Afternoon), such as Bonkers and Goof Troop before the 5 p.m. news, similar to WXON (channel 20, now WMYD) and WKBD-TV (channel 50, now a CW owned-and-operated station) across the river in Detroit. While the station aired many CTV programs, it was never branded as a CTV station directly, but it was labelled as a BBS station instead. For all intents and purposes, it was Windsor's CTV affiliate for most of this time, if in programming and not by affiliation or name. Windsor is one of the few major Canadian cities that has never had a CTV affiliate of its own, largely because CTV owns the Canadian rights to a large amount of American programming. The Windsor area is considered part of the Detroit market for purposes of programming rights, and Windsor stations have often had to adjust their coverage or programming under pressure from the Detroit stations. CTV programming is piped in via CKCO on basic cable; that station's Sarnia-area translator was the nearest over-the-air source of CTV programming until it was shut down in May 2020.

It was broadcast on channel 16 only (its Wheatley transmitter) for the first two years. However, the transmitter was located farther to the southeast, presumably to protect the Detroit stations. As a result, it was practically unviewable over-the-air in Windsor.

In response to complaints from the Windsor area, Baton applied for a Windsor-area translator on VHF channel 6, with an effective radiated power of 87 watts, in 1994. While the CRTC agreed to this request, the U.S. Federal Communications Commission (FCC) refused to sign off on it, citing potential interference with WLNS-TV from Lansing, Michigan. However, the FCC recommended UHF channel 60 instead. The CRTC agreed, and Baton was allowed to place a broadcast translator in Windsor on channel 60 with an effective radiated power of 580 watts (with the same signal contours as channel 6 at 87 watts). However, some close-in suburbs of Windsor including Tecumseh, were not (and still are not, as of 2011) able to receive the channel 60 signal, or the channel 16 signal, and must rely on cable to watch CHWI-TV.

CHUM and The New WI

In 1997, the station was sold by Electrohome and Baton Broadcasting to CHUM Limited as a result of an affiliation swap which saw BBS gain control of the CTV network. CHUM would reformat the station (along with the other independent stations that CHUM acquired in the deal) with a lineup and branding similar to its new sister station CKVR-TV in Barrie, which would be known as "NewNet". CHWI would be rebranded as "The New WI" as a part of the format change.

In 2000, CHUM Limited applied to increase CHWI's transmitter power from 580 watts, to 5.8 kilowatts (10 times the strength), and was approved. Its Windsor transmitter stands atop the 34-floor Victoria Park Place apartment building, currently the tallest building in Windsor.

As a result of CHUM's acquisition of Craig Media (and its rebranding of a series of stations in Western Canada as Citytv stations on the same day), the NewNet stations (along with CHWI) were rebranded as A-Channel in August 2005.

Sale to CTV

In 2007, Omni Television owner Rogers Media had announced it would acquire the A-Channel stations, including CHWI, along with SexTV: The Channel, CLT, Access, and CKX-TV in Brandon, Manitoba in the wake of CTVglobemedia's pending takeover of the CHUM Limited group. The transaction reportedly cost $137 million, which would be paid in cash by Rogers. The CRTC later announced its approval of CTVglobemedia's purchase of CHUM Limited, but it added a condition that CTVglobemedia must sell off CHUM's Citytv stations to another buyer. As such, CTVglobemedia retained the A-Channel stations and all of CHUM's specialty channels, and sold the Citytv stations to Rogers Media. Additionally, the A-Channel stations were rebranded simply as "A" in August 2008.

Threatened closure and reprieve
On February 25, 2009, CTV announced that, given the ongoing structural problems facing the conventional television sector in Canada and the global economic crisis, it would not be applying to the CRTC for renewal of the licences of CHWI-TV, CKNX-TV and CKX-TV. CTV said that with the CRTC's decision to disallow fee-for-carriage, CHWI and CKNX-TV – the two smallest stations in the A system – were no longer viable. Even though both stations were losing money for CTV, in the case of CHWI, this came despite its dominant ratings in local news over CBET. After being threatened with closure in early 2009, recent CRTC decisions to increase funding for local stations across Canada are expected to allow CHWI to remain on the air.

The stations' transmitters were slated to be shut down entirely, instead of being converted to rebroadcasters of London's A station, CFPL-TV. CFPL was expected to be available on cable and satellite in the affected areas, and CTV initially planned to continue news coverage of the southwestern Ontario region through CFPL-TV and CKCO-TV.

The Windsor Star reported on March 4, 2009, that Windsor City Council, local Members of Provincial Parliament Sandra Pupatello and Dwight Duncan, and federal Members of Parliament Brian Masse and Joe Comartin began lobbying the CRTC and CTVglobemedia not to shut down CHWI, as it is the only local privately owned television station in Windsor.

On April 30, 2009, Shaw Communications announced that it would purchase CHWI-TV, CKNX-TV and CKX-TV for one dollar each from CTV, pending CRTC approval. However, it was reported on June 30, 2009, that Shaw had backed out of the deal and was declining to complete the purchase, putting the stations' futures in serious doubt.

On July 6, after the CRTC announced policy changes to increase funding for small-market television stations (including the likely implementation of carriage fees), CTV said it would "review" its decision to close CHWI. The company announced two days later that CHWI would remain on the air for at least another year, based on temporary increases to the Local Programming Improvement Fund. The other two stations were not as fortunate, however; CKNX-TV's transmitter was retained to rebroadcast CFPL-TV, and CKX-TV was closed down in October. In correlation to the reprieve from closure, the CRTC renewed the licenses for CHWI-TV, CKNX-TV and CKX-TV, even though CTV had not filed renewals for these stations.

Sale to Bell, CTV Two/CTV 2

On September 10, 2010, Bell Canada announced plans to re-acquire 100% of CTVglobemedia, a deal which was finalized in April 2011. CTVglobemedia was officially restructured as Bell Media on April 1, 2011. One month later, Bell revealed that the A system, including CHWI and London sister station CFPL, would be relaunched as CTV Two beginning with the 2011–12 television season; A was officially relaunched as CTV Two on August 29, 2011. Alongside the relaunch came the rebranding of CHWI's newscasts as CTV News Windsor, and the establishment of a high-definition feed for its new digital signal.

On August 15, 2011, CHWI-DT, along with CBET-DT, became available to Shaw Direct subscribers with a 600-series receiver. On November 29, 2012, Bell Satellite TV also began carrying CHWI-DT on channel 585.

Programming
CHWI carries the entirety of the CTV 2 national schedule, and its schedule is almost identical to that of CFPL, apart from most local newscasts.

News operation
CHWI-DT presently broadcasts seven hours of locally produced newscasts each week (with one hour each on weekdays, Saturdays and Sundays). The former A Morning show had a contributor from Windsor, however, only the news anchor and weather anchor are based at the station's downtown Windsor studio. Prior to 2009, weather reports were based at CFPL-TV. Sports news continue to be based out of the studios at CFPL in London. Prior to 2003, CHWI's newscasts were produced entirely out of CFPL's London studios from a separate news set, and until 2014, both weekend newscasts were simulcast with CFPL. In January 2014, CHWI began producing local 6 p.m. weekend newscasts.

Sports and weather segments are still produced out of CFPL's London facility, while news segments are conducted from CHWI's Windsor studios. From 1993 to 1999, the Windsor newsroom was located at the corner of Riverside Drive East and Goyeau Street, at the foot of the 75 Riverside Drive apartments – which were left abandoned for 10 years after the move before being replaced by a restaurant. From then until November 25, 2013, the station was based at nearby 300 Ouellette Avenue, co-located with the now-defunct Palace Cinemas. In April 2013, Bell Media announced that the station would move to newly constructed facilities at the Bell Canada Building on Goyeau Street; the former studio was subsequently redeveloped as the new headquarters of the Windsor Star.

Technical information

Subchannel

Analogue-to-digital conversion
On August 31, 2011, when Canadian television stations in CRTC-designated mandatory markets transitioned from analogue to digital broadcasts, CHWI-TV flash cut its digital signal into operation, using its former UHF analog channels 16 and 26. In January 2011, CHWI's Windsor repeater moved its analog signal from UHF channel 60, which was among the high band UHF channels (52–69) that would be removed from broadcasting use as a result of the transition, to channel 26.

In addition, CHWI-TV-60 has been authorised to relocate its analog transmitter to channel 26, and to switch its digital allotment from UHF channel 25 to channel 26, due to the phaseout of UHF channels 52–69. However, the CRTC decision did not address potential co-channel interference issues with WLPC-LP in Detroit, which also broadcast its analog signal on channel 26 (an unprotected frequency); as a result, that station went silent during much of 2011, not returning to air until November of that year as WLPC-LD (now WLPC-CD), on digital channel 40 with its sole companion PSIP (or virtual channel) of 40.1.

On April 29, 2019, CTV updated broadcast channels for stations in Toronto, Victoria, and Windsor. CHWI now broadcasts on channel 17, but retains virtual channel 26.1.

As part of the 600 MHz spectrum auction that was mandated by the Federal Communications Commission of the U.S. as well as Innovation, Science and Economic Development Canada, CHWI-DT-60 moved from UHF 26 to UHF 17 by turning off its old transmitter at 12:01 a.m., and turning its new one on at roughly 2 a.m. on April 29. The station decreased power slightly from 200 to 162 watts, and slightly decreased its height on the Victoria Park Place apartment tower from 93.8 to 89 metres, all to maintain roughly equal coverage in comparison to its previous analog and digital operations at that site.

Rebroadcaster

References

External links
 CTV 2 Windsor
 
 

HWI-DT
HWI-DT
Television channels and stations established in 1993
1993 establishments in Ontario